Game of Fools is the second album of the hard rock band Koritni. The Album was released on 16 March 2009 by the record label Bad Reputation.

Track listing
 "155" - 4:05
 "Stab in the Back" - 3:42
 "Roll the Dice" - 4:13
 "V8 Fantasy" - 3:32
 "You VS Me" - 4:12
 "By My Side" - 3:51
 "Deranged" - 3:39
 "Nobody's Home" - 3:03
 "Game of Fools" - 4:02
 "Keep Me Breathing" - 4:22
 "Tornado Dreaming" - 4:22
 "Tornado Dreaming II" - 4:08
 "The Devil's Daughter" - 4:20

All songs composed by Lex Koritni and Eddy Santacreu.

Personnel
 Lex Koritni - Vocals
 Chris Brown - Drums
 Luke Cuerten - Rhythm Guitar
 Eddy Santacreu - Lead Guitar
 Matt Hunter - Bass guitar

References

External links
 Official Website

2009 albums